A Greater Yes: The Story of Amy Newhouse is a 2009 Christian film released on May 28, 2009. The story is about Amy Newhouse, who died of cancer, and the effects of her life and death on her surrounding community. The film was shot entirely on location in Amarillo and Pampa, Texas.

Background
Amy Michelle Newhouse was born in Kerrville, Texas on September 24, 1982 and moved with her family to Pampa in 1994. She attended Pampa schools and was active in Teen Leadership, Girls for Christ, Business Professionals of America, and Thespian Society; and was manager of the Pampa High School volleyball team. She was active on the drama team with the youth of Trinity Fellowship of Pampa. She planned to attend Christ for the Nation's College in Dallas.  She died on September 18, 1999, aged 16.  She is buried at Citizens Cemetery in Clarendon.

Plot
A Greater Yes: The Story of Amy Newhouse is based on the true story of Texas teenager Amy Newhouse whose battle with cancer did not save her life, but sparked a revival in her community. Amy was a very popular girl at Pampa High School, but she was stricken with cancer. Amy ultimately learns that the "yes" from God is not what she expects, but became instead "a greater yes." Revival breaks out in the area as Amy's faith becomes an example to everyone.

Cast
 Anne Underwood as Amy Newhouse
 Mike Norris as Kevin
 Bradley Dorsey as Tyler

References

External links
 
 

2009 films
2009 drama films
American drama films
Films about evangelicalism
Films set in Texas
Films shot in Texas
Pure Flix Entertainment films
2000s English-language films
2000s American films